A list of films produced by the Israeli film industry in 1973.

1973 releases

See also
1973 in Israel

References

External links
 Israeli films of 1973 at the Internet Movie Database

Israeli
Film
1973